AC Mamura is a football club of East Timor based in Díli, More specifically in the Pite neighborhood, 88000 Kakaulidun Street. The team plays in the Liga Futebol Amadora Terceira Divisão.

Competition records

Liga Futebol Amadora 
LFA Terceira 2019: 2nd places in Groub A

References

Football clubs in East Timor
Football
Sport in Dili
Association football clubs established in 2019